The Pico do Itambé State Park is a state park in the state of Minas Gerais, Brazil. It protects one of the higher peaks in the state.

Location

The Pico do Itambé State Park is divided between the municipalities of Santo Antônio do Itambé, Serro and Serra Azul de Minas in Minas Gerais. The word "Itambé" is of indigenous origin and means "sharp stone". The park protects the Serra do Espinhaço, a mountain range. The highest peak is the  Pico do Itambé, a major landmark of the state. It contains various springs and headwaters of the Jequitinhonha and Doce rivers.

History

The Pico do Itambé State Park  was created by decree 39.398 of 21 January 1998.
It is administered by the Instituto Estadual de Florestas of Minas Gerais.
The park became part of the Espinhaço Mosaic of conservation units, created in 2010.

Environment

The park has a typical tropical climate with a dry season from June to August and a rainy season from November to March. The vegetation includes high rocky fields and cerrado, with luxuriant rainforest in the valley floors.

The park is in the transition between the Atlantic Forest and cerrado biomes. It includes rupestrian vegetation, grasslands, cerrado and seasonal forest. Flora include Anadenanthera colubrina, Copaifera langsdorffii , Dalbergia nigra, Handroanthus albus, Eremanthus erythropappus, Trattinnickia burseraefolia, Calophyllum brasiliense, Byrsonima crassifolia, Vellozia squamata and various species endemic to the region. A new bromeliad was discovered in the rocky cliffs of the Fumaça waterfall in 2007, named Orthophytum itambense. In 2021 a new bromeliad, Waltillia itambana, was found to be endemic to the park.

There is a varied fauna, including southern tamandua (Tamandua tetradactyla), maned wolf (Chrysocyon brachyurus), ocelot (Leopardus pardalis), cougar (Puma concolor) and Coimbra Filho's titi (Callicebus coimbrai). In 2011 a new species of amphibian was discovered in the park (Crossodactylodes itambe).

Tourism

The park is part of the Diamonds and Royal Road tourist circuit. The best time to visit is in the dry season from April to October as between November and March the trails may be closed on rainy days.

The Waterfalls trail leads to four waterfalls, the furthest of which is the Rio Vermelho,  from the main road. The Fumaça waterfall has a  drop. The Tropeiros trail is part of a historical route used by merchants travelling between Santo Antônio do Itambé e Capivari. Guides are recommended but not required. The Mountains and Valleys trail leads to the Pico do Itambé, and is more physically demanding. Authorization is required to take the Tropeiros trail or visit the Pico do Itambé.

Notes

Sources

State parks of Brazil
Protected areas established in 1998
1998 establishments in Brazil
Protected areas of Minas Gerais